Mauro Nahuel Estol Rodríguez (born 27 January 1995), known as Mauro Estol, is a Uruguayan footballer who plays as a midfielder for Cerro Largo.

Club career

Bisceglie
On 28 August 2019, he signed with the Italian club Bisceglie.

References

External links

1995 births
Footballers from Montevideo
Living people
Uruguayan footballers
Uruguayan expatriate footballers
Association football midfielders
Racing Club de Montevideo players
A.S. Bisceglie Calcio 1913 players
Juventud de Las Piedras players
Cerro Largo F.C. players
Montevideo Wanderers F.C. players
Uruguayan Primera División players
Serie C players
Uruguayan Segunda División players
Uruguayan expatriate sportspeople in Italy
Expatriate footballers in Italy